The Lagos-Ibadan Railway is a 157 kilometres long standard gauge railway between Lagos and Ibadan, with an extension of about 7 km to join the rail line to the port in Lagos.

Construction 
In 2017, the China Civil Engineering Construction Company commenced operation on the double track rail-line. The Lagos-Ibadan railway is one of the Nigeria Railway Modernization Project which is set to connect Lagos to Abuja then Kano via Minna and Kaduna with a total length of 1315 Km. The Lagos-Ibadan segment is the second phase of the project.

However, for ease of construction, the Lagos-Ibadan segment of the project was sub-divided into three phases. First, the construction of Ebute Meta to Iju Ishaga Station; Second, the Agbado to Abeokuta Station; and finally, the Abeokuta to Ibadan Station . The cost of the project was $1.6 billion.

Operation 
The project was commissioned for operation by President Muhammadu Buhari at the official flag-off ceremony for the full commercial operations on 10 June 2021.

Reference 

Rail transport in Nigeria
Rail transport in Africa
Railway lines by continent
Railway lines in Nigeria
Rail transport in Lagos